Masoud Mir Kazemi (born  1960) is an Iranian conservative politician and the current Vice President of Iran and head of Plan and Budget Organization. He was a member of the Parliament of Iran from Tehran district from 2012 until 2016, and also previously served at two ministerial posts in the cabinet of Mahmoud Ahmadinejad.

Early life and education
Kazemi was born in Tehran in 1960. He received a bachelor's degree and a master's degree from Iran University of Science and Technology in 1986 and 1989, respectively. He also holds PhD in industrial engineering from Tarbiat Modarres University (1996).

Career
After the 1979 revolution, Kazemi became a member of the revolution committees and then of the IRGC. Then he headed Shahed University. He was Iran's minister of commerce during the first term of president Mahmoud Ahmadinejad from 2005 to 2009. Kazemi discussed the possibility of making neighbouring Iraq a major gas export market, citing the destruction of Iraq's energy infrastructure as a result of the 2003 invasion of Iraq.

He served as minister of petroleum from 2009 to 2011, replacing Gholam Hossein Nozari after Ahmadinejad was re-elected.

On 14 October 2010, Mir Kazemi was elected as conference president for 2011 OPEC.

On 9 May 2011, it was announced that Mir Kazemi, Sadegh Mahsouli and Ali Akbar Mehrabian would leave the cabinet. He was not participating in cabinet meetings from June 2011 and Mohammad Aliabadi was acting minister in his absence. He announced his candidacy for Parliament of Iran in the 2012 legislative election on 22 December 2011 and was elected as an MP from Tehran.

References

External links

|-

|-

|-

1960 births
Living people
Iran University of Science and Technology alumni
Tarbiat Modares University alumni
Academic staff of Imam Hossein University
Government ministers of Iran
Oil ministers of Iran
People from Tehran
Front of Islamic Revolution Stability politicians
Iranian industrial engineers
Islamic Revolution Committees personnel
Islamic Revolutionary Guard Corps officers